The worse-than-average effect or below-average effect is the human tendency to underestimate one's achievements and capabilities in relation to others.  

It is the opposite of the usually pervasive better-than-average effect (in contexts where the two are compared or the overconfidence effect in other situations). It has been proposed more recently to explain reversals of that effect, where people instead underestimate their own desirable traits.

This effect seems to occur when chances of success are perceived to be extremely rare. Traits which people tend to underestimate include juggling ability, the ability to ride a unicycle, the odds of living past 100 or of finding a U.S. twenty dollar bill on the ground in the next two weeks.

Some have attempted to explain this cognitive bias in terms of the regression fallacy or of self-handicapping. In a 2012 article in Psychological Bulletin it is suggested the worse-than-average effect (as well as other cognitive biases) can be explained by a simple information-theoretic generative mechanism that assumes a noisy conversion of objective evidence (observation) into subjective estimates (judgment).

See also
 Dunning–Kruger effect
 List of cognitive biases

References

Cognitive biases